Natasha Seatter (KL, Malaysia) is a Malaysian racing driver.

Early life 
Born to a Scottish-Malaysian parentage Natasha.

Career

Karting
Natasha Seatter  made her freshman debut in karting in 2005. She started her career as a junior member of the Klub Kart Selangor and placed overall 3rd in the KKS series in 2005. In 2006, she got two 1st places in the KKS club series. In the same year at the age of 11 years, she entered her first international race in Dubai using a Biland 250cc kart.

Since her debut she has competed in championships held across Malaysia, Thailand, Indonesia, Philippines, Macau, India,  China,  Singapore, Japan and United Arab Emirates.
During 2008, she placed 2nd in the Yamaha SL Cup Malaysian series and third in the senior ladies in Yamaha SL Cup, Japan. In the same year she was placed 4th in the Asian Karting Open Championship in the 125cc KF3 series with 5 podium wins.

Formula BMW, Formula Pilota, Formula Gulf

Her racing career was elevated to the next level when she was awarded with the Petronas Formula Xperience (PFX) scholarship. Natasha defeated her male counterparts (of the same of age) in four PFX races. She is the first racer in PFX history to obtain 1st place four times in a row in the formula BMW racing car. The races were also part of the support race of the Millennium Endurance Race 2009 held at Sepang, Malaysia F1 circuit. Her unprecedented success secured her a spot in the Petronas Mofaz Racing Team in which she competed as the first and only female racer and was dubbed rookie of the year in 2009. Natasha became the first female Malaysian racer ever to race in the Formula BMW Asia Pacific Series when she competed as a rookie in 2010.  In August 2011 she has been quoted as Asia’s fastest female formula driver in the local paper after her first podium win in the Pilota series in China.

Natasha also gained international exposure by participating in the Macau Street Race, Singapore F1  Street Race and Okayama International Circuit, Japan and  Buddh International Circuit, India. She also finished in the top ten racing in the  JK Racing Asia Series at Sepang International Circuit and Guangdong International Circuit, China. In January 2011, Natasha was the youngest and only female racing driver who was tested and approved by former F1 champions, Nigel Mansell, Jean Alesi and the current lotus F1 development driver, James Rossiter to drive the new Lotus T125 at the Yas Marina Circuit, Abu Dhabi.

Natasha participated in the 2011 JK Racing Asia Series and her best race was in Singapore where she qualified as 3rd fastest and her best finish is 5th. She was invited as guest driver in the VW Women’s VW polo cup race in Chennai where she emerged 3rd. She also raced in the Formula Pilota China Series in Ordos where she was also 3rd. She took part in the Merdeka 12-hour endurance race in a Scirocco (the only female participant) and her team got 6th place in class. She has raced in the FG1000 formula gulf series in Dubai and Abu Dhabi where she has set the record for being the fastest female racer in the Middle East. In Feb 2012 she made history by becoming first female ever to win a race in the Middle East.   In March 2012 she set the fastest lap time in the Yas Marina Circuit Abu Dhabi in the Formula FG1000 gulf series. 2011/12 Formula Gulf 1000 Series (UAE) Championship runner up with 6 podiums. 2012/13 Formula Gulf 1000 Series UAE Gulf Sport Champion with 10 podiums.  She was invited as guest driver for 2013/14 Formula Gulf Series UAE in Nov 2013 and won 2 races and set fastest lap.

GT Asia Cup, Porsche Carrera Cup Asia, VW Polo Cup Race, VW Scirocco MME
Driver for Team Craft Bamboo for GT Asia Cup in Aston Martin Vantage, South Korea in 2014.  Awarded best performing driver Trophy.
Guest stand-in driver for Team Starchase, for the Porsche Carrera Cup Asia during the support race for F1 Shanghai in 2013 in Group A.
Guest driver for VW Polo Cup Race in Chennai, India  in 2011 (3rd).
Guest driver for VW Scirocco Team in Malaysia Merdeka Endurance Race 2011 (6th in class).

Malaysia Super Series MSS

2013 Malaysia Super Series Championship Runner up with 4 podiums for the GT open category in a Radical SR8 despite having 2 DNFs for engine failure.

Media

She has been featured on covers of 2 international magazines,  Intersection magazine Feb 2012 and Women’s Health & Fitness Feb 2012 and 8 local covers such as P1 Circuit Magazine (Jan 2010), Prestige magazine (May 2010), Wanita (May 2010), 360 Celsius (June 2011), Glam Magazine (March 2012), Majalah Wanita & Wawasan (March 2012),  Campus Life Magazine (Sept 2013)and Health & Beauty Magazine Malaysia (Dec 2013).  Other feature stories appeared in Mingguan Wanita, Go karting magazines, Faces Magazine, Harper's Bazaar Malaysia, Harper's Bazaar Arabia, Cleo, Hanger, Crank & Piston, F1weekly, Female Racing News, Gulf news, Sport 360,  sport 247 Malaysia, Unreserved, Seventeen, NewMan, The Heat, Singgah, Female, 2013 Malaysia F1 programme book, Brand Laureate Magazine, Berita Harian, Harian Metro, The Edge Financial, New Straits Times, The Star and The Malay Mail.

She has appeared as guest in numerous radio and local TV and also interviewed on various sports news channels in China, Macau, India, Japan, United Kingdom, Hong Kong and also on ESPN Star Sports, Mobil 1 The Grid, and F1 Weekly.  She was featured in the Spring/summer edition of Harpers Arabia as one of top 20 best dressed in Middle East.  Natasha was awarded The BrandLaureate country branding award as a top athlete in 2013.   Natasha has big ambitions to compete in the GT Asia, LMP2 , Le Mans 24 series and of course sets her dream to compete in the Formula 1.

References

External links

 http://www.natasharacing.com

Living people
Year of birth missing (living people)
Malaysian racing drivers
Female racing drivers
Malaysian people of Scottish descent
Eurasia Motorsport drivers
Craft-Bamboo Racing drivers
Formula Masters China drivers
Sportspeople from Kuala Lumpur